Statistics of the Primera División de México for the 1952–53 season.

Overview

La Piedad was promoted to Primera División.

The season was contested by 12 teams, and Tampico won the championship.

La Piedad was relegated to Segunda División.

Teams

League standings

Results

References
Mexico - List of final tables (RSSSF)

1952-53
Mex
1952–53 in Mexican football